Luca Turilli (born 5 March 1972) is an Italian composer, arranger, producer and multi-instrumentalist constantly engaged in various musical projects.

Having always declared to love music at 360 degrees, Turilli has dedicated himself to multiple musical genres, ranging from trance and electronic music of his first compositions to symphonic metal inspired by the world of soundtracks and also to modern pop and piano compositions of his current productions.

He is one of the founders of the symphonic power metal band Rhapsody, later called Rhapsody of Fire., band for which he composed and arranged all music with his colleague Alex Staropoli from 1997 until the friendly split of 2011. After 2011 he released three more albums under the name Luca Turilli's Rhapsody and one under the name Turilli / Lione Rhapsody.

In the early 2000s he also worked on a trilogy of solo albums as Luca Turilli, and released one album under the name of Luca Turilli's Dreamquest, a symphonic metal / rock project combined with electro pop elements he worked on alongside Dominique Leurquin.

Though his lyrics in Rhapsody of Fire dealt with epic, sword and sorcery high fantasy, namely a saga of his own design, the lyrics of his later albums speak mainly about science, metaphysics, psychology, anthropology and are generally related with the mysteries of life - Turilli's greatest passion after what he started experiencing thanks to his long-term yoga and meditation practices.

In 2020, with the piano being one of his favorite instruments, he also announced his entry into the market of modern, emotional and cinematic piano with the release of his debut piano album, in the tradition of artists like Yann Tiersen, Ludovico Einaudi and Yiruma, some of the well-known piano composers of our time and a true inspiration to him, underlining his need for continuous artistic challenges and the need to express himself at 360 degrees.

Early life 

Turilli was born in Trieste, Venezia Giulia. His father was a cello player who died when Turilli was only two years old. He inherited his passion for classical music and at 16 years old he started playing guitar. In 1993, Turilli survived cancer at age 21. At the age of 22, he started playing piano.

Career
 
In 1993, Turilli founded the band Thundercross, which was renamed Rhapsody after releasing the first demo, and renamed once again to Rhapsody of Fire for trademark reasons in 2006.

In 2008, Turilli began an online guitar course titled Luca Turilli's Neoclassical Revelation. The course takes its name from his neoclassical playing style.

In August 2011, some time after releasing the last album related with the heroic-fantasy saga on which all the lyrics and music of Rhapsody / Rhapsody of Fire were based until then, Turilli and Staropoli proceeded to a friendly split. Alex agreed to go on as Rhapsody of Fire, while Turilli decided to move on as Luca Turilli's Rhapsody, adding his name on top of the logo because of trademark reasons and old legal settlements. In 2015, after releasing the debut album entitled Ascending to Infinity, the record company Nuclear Blast released the one defined by Turilli as one of the most important albums of his career: Prometheus, Symphonia Ignis Divinus. 
One year later the same album was released under the title Prometheus, The Dolby Atmos Experience + Cinematic and Live. That album, mixed by producer/mixing engineer Chris Heil (David Bowie, Bryan Adams), was the first one in music history to be mixed in Dolby Atmos and its music was used by Dolby and Yamaha to promote Dolby Atmos technology worldwide.

From November 2016 to March 2018, Turilli and his former bandmates Fabio Lione and Alex Holzwarth who in the meantime had also left Rhapsody of Fire, gathered to celebrate the band's 20th anniversary by playing their entire best-selling album Symphony of Enchanted Lands in a tour called the 20th Anniversary Farewell Tour.
After the end of the Farewell Tour, the initial intention was to close the Rhapsody chapter once and for all. We can say that the promoters and the fans, considering the success of that tour, basically convinced Turilli and Fabio to go on with Rhapsody, although both had different artistic plans in mind. For legal reasons the new band was called Turilli / Lione Rhapsody. Both agreed to such plan and to use the same band name only if they could bring something really new to the table, combining their typical symphonic metal approach with all the modern music they like to listen to nowadays, evolving the sound, the image and the lyrical concept of the band to new horizons. To make this more than clear they agreed to entitle the album Zero Gravity (Rebirth and Evolution) and filled it with what they both love: vocal interludes à la Queen, progressive elements à la Dream Theater, electronic, ethnic music and more.
In both bands, Luca Turilli's Rhapsody and Turilli / Lione Rhapsody, Turilli is the only composer of all music and lyrics, orchestral arrangements and in addition to guitars he also played all the keyboard parts.

In early 2020, Turilli stated in an interview with Steinberg that he feels the constant need to evolve and explore the world of music by creating new projects, finding new artistic goals and stimulations. He is currently working on the debut album of his new band presenting a modern pop/rock sound in the style of some of his actual favorite artists like Adele and bands like Muse and Imagine Dragons, enriched by electronic, ethnic music and all those symphonic elements which are now a real trademark in his discography.

Playing style 

Early in his career Turilli was influenced by guitarists such as Yngwie Malmsteen, Tony MacAlpine, Marty Friedman and especially Jason Becker, still considered by him today as the greatest guitarist ever. His lead playing often includes extensive use of sweep picked arpeggios, tremolo picking, classically influenced phrases, and scales such as aeolian, harmonic minor, phrygian, locrian, and melodic minor. In his latest albums he introduced new ethnic elements too (Hirajoshi and Pentatonic scales).

As a pianist his main influences are romantic pianists like Chopin and contemporary composers such as Ludovico Einaudi, Yann Tiersen, Yiruma and Philip Glass.

Gear

Home studio
To compose and arrange his music, Turilli uses a template of over 6,000 tracks based on the Cubase software.
He is using one main computer based on an Intel Xeon double processor and two additional "slave" PCs for a total of 256 GB of RAM. All template sounds are located on a total of 8 SSDs. Vienna Ensemble Pro is the additional software he is using for Cubase to "communicate" with the sounds located on the main PC and the two slaves. 
It took seven years of work in collaboration with Tobias Escher (Novatlan Studio / Orchestral Tools) for Turilli to have a universal template available allowing him to compose for most music styles and different music projects. Using the same template, he can now compose for all styles of pop, rock, metal, symphonic, ethnic, folk, ambient, trance, electronic, hip-hop or trap music.

Guitars
Turilli uses custom "Luca Turilli" electric guitars made by the French luthier Christophe Capelli. He has four of them (black, white, blue and red) being part of the first series (Neoclassical Revelation Series) and three of them (black, white and red) being part of the new "Neoclassical revelation 2.0" Series.

His new signature guitars feature a DiMarzio Tone Zone pickup in the bridge position and DiMarzio Air Norton in the neck position. They also feature maple necks, 22 fret ebony fingerboards with a custom "Tree of Life" inlay and Ibanez Lo-Pro Edge tremolo systems. The wood used for the body is alder.

Turilli uses Furch and Gibson acoustic guitars.

Pianos
Turilli owns Kawai and Schulze Pollmann pianos.

Discography

Solo
 Earthrise (2021)

Luca Turilli Band
 King of the Nordic Twilight (1999)
 Prophet of the Last Eclipse (2002)
 The Infinite Wonders of Creation (2006)

Luca Turilli's Dreamquest
 Lost Horizons (2006)

Luca Turilli's Rhapsody
 Ascending to Infinity (2012)
 Prometheus, Symphonia Ignis Divinus (2015)
 Prometheus, The Dolby Atmos Experience + Cinematic and Live (2016)

Turilli / Lione Rhapsody
Zero Gravity (Rebirth and Evolution) (2019)

Rhapsody of Fire
 Legendary Tales (1997)
 Symphony of Enchanted Lands (1998)
 Dawn of Victory (2000)
 Rain of a Thousand Flames (2001)
 Power of the Dragonflame (2002)
 The Dark Secret (2004) – EP
 Symphony of Enchanted Lands II: The Dark Secret (2004)
 The Magic of the Wizard's Dream (2005) – EP
 Live in Canada 2005: The Dark Secret (2006)
 Triumph or Agony (2006)
 The Frozen Tears of Angels (2010)
 The Cold Embrace of Fear – A Dark Romantic Symphony (2010)
 From Chaos to Eternity (2011)

Guest appearances
 Kamelot – Epica (Guitar solo on "Descent of the Archangel")
 Dyslesia – Who Dares Wins (Guitar solo on "Unknown Fighter")
 Kamelot – Silverthorn (Latin consultant)

References

1972 births
Rhapsody of Fire members
Living people
Musicians from Trieste
Male guitarists
Luca Turilli (band) members
Luca Turilli's Rhapsody members
Luca Turilli's Dreamquest members